Sensorica is an open value network (OVN), established in 2011 in Montreal, Canada, for open source hardware development. It is a pilot project for commons-based peer production applied to hardware, designed to operate at large scale. It was established in Montreal, Quebec, Canada, in February 2011.

Sensorica uses the Resources, Events, Agents accounting model as a basis of its network resource planning and contribution / value accounting system (NRP-VAS). The NRP is an Enterprise Resource Planning (ERP) type of software based on the REA model to support the complexity of operations in an OVN. It collects, stores, and interprets data from all the different types of activities in the network and connects them to specific resources, events, and agents to keep track of the contributed value on resource level. In NRP, everything is connected together. Economic agents are associated with other agents and participate in events of various types, such as processes, exchanges, or transfers. Events change the state of resources by using, citing, consuming, creating, or transferring them. A certain resource may be an output from one event and then an input to another one. Those events are then again connected with a resource flow.

References

External links 
 A New Economy, documentary
 DOSSIER MODÈLES D'AFFAIRES INNOVANTS - Sensorica : Nouveau modèle d’affaires ou mode passagère?

Open-source hardware
Organizations based in Montreal